Stop Me Here (original title: Arrêtez-moi là) is a 2015 French thriller-drama film directed by Gilles Bannier.

Plot
Samson Cazalet, a taxi driver in the Nice region, is accused of kidnapping the daughter of a client he had collected at the airport.

Cast

 Reda Kateb : Samson Cazalet
 Léa Drucker : Louise Lablache
 Julia Piaton : The Judge
 Gilles Cohen : Lawyer Portal
 Stéphanie Murat : Lawyer Hélène Lafferrière
 Erika Sainte : Elisabeth Ostrovsky
 Philippe Fretun : François Pastor
 Cosme Castro : Herrero
 Themis Pauwels : Mélanie Lablache
 Guillaume Toucas : Archambaud
 Nicole Shirer : Madame Gravate
 Tien Shue : Lu-Pan
 Manon Simier & Amélie Robin : Flavie
 Sandrine Blancke : The Clerk
 Sabina Sciubba : The Singer

References

External links

2015 films
2015 thriller drama films
French thriller drama films
Films based on British novels
Films about taxis
2015 drama films
2010s French films